This article covers the 2017–18 season for Luftëtari Gjirokastër. They participate in the Albanian Superliga and the Albanian Cup.

Current squad

Competitions

Kategoria Superiore

League table

Results summary

Results by round

References

Luftëtari Gjirokastër seasons
Luftëtari Gjirokastër